The 327th Bombardment Squadron is an inactive United States Air Force unit.  It was last assigned to the 4170th Strategic Wing, stationed at Larson Air Force Base, Washington.  It was inactivated on 1 February 1963.

History

World War II

Initial organization and training
The squadron was activated at Barksdale Field, Louisiana on 1 March 1942, as the 327th Bombardment Squadron, one of the four original squadrons of the 92nd Bombardment Group. Later that month it moved to MacDill Field, Florida and trained with Boeing B-17 Flying Fortresses. While training in Florida, the squadron also flew antisubmarine patrols off the Florida coast. The squadron's air echelon departed Sarasota Army Air Field for Westover Field, Massachusetts on 19 June 1942, flying on to Dow Field, Maine on 29 June. The squadron then ferried their B-17s across the North Atlantic via Newfoundland starting between 12 and 15 August. They flew directly from Newfoundland to Prestwick Airport, Scotland. The 92nd Group was the first to fly their bombers non-stop across the Atlantic. Meanwhile,  the ground echelon left Bradenton on 18 July, arriving at Fort Dix, New Jersey in the New York Port of Embarkation two days later.

Operations in the European Theater
The buildup of Eighth Air Force in England required the establishment of a combat crew replacement and training center, but a lack of qualified personnel and aircraft hampered its development.  As a result, the decision was made to use the 92nd Group and its squadrons as a temporary crew training unit, acting as the main component of what became the 11th Combat Crew Replacement Center Group.  However, the 92d was the first group to arrive in England with improved B-17Fs, and with the training mission came an exchange of these newer models for the older B-17Es of the 97th Bombardment Group to use in training.  On 6 September, to provide the squadron with combat experience, it flew its first combat mission against the Potez aircraft factory at Meaulte, France.  Although remaining a replacement crew training unit until May 1943, the squadron initially flew occasional combat missions.  In January 1943, he squadron moved to RAF Alconbury.

In 1942 and 1943, there were no fighters capable of escorting bomber formations on deep strike missions.  The Army Air Forces tested heavily armed bombers to act as escorts and protect the bomb-carrying aircraft from enemy fighters.  As it ended its training duties, The 327th became the only squadron to be equipped with the experimental Boeing YB-40 Flying Fortress gunship from May through July 1943.   Twelve of the YB-40s were dispatched to Alconbury for testing and evaluation.  The first operational YB-40 sortie took place on 29 May 1943 against submarine pens at Saint-Nazaire, France.  Very early on, it was found that the additional drag of the turrets and the extra weight of the guns, armor, and additional ammunition reduced the speed of the YB-40 to a point where it could not maintain formation with the standard B-17s on the way home from the target once they had released their bombs. The YB-40 could protect itself fairly well, but not the bombers it was supposed to defend. Consequently, the surviving YB-40s were converted back to standard B-17F configuration or used as gunnery trainers back in the United States.  The squadron ended YB-40 operations after fewer than 10 missions on 29 July 1943.  

In May 1943, the squadron's training mission was transferred and the 327th began flying combat missions.   Through May 1944 its targets included shipyards at Kiel, ball bearing plants at Schweinfurt, submarine pens at Wilhelmshaven, a tire manufacturing plant at Hannover, airfields near Paris, an aircraft factory at Nantes and a magnesium mine in Norway.

The squadron earned a Distinguished Unit Citation (DUC) on 11 January 1944, when it successfully bombed aircraft manufacturing factories in Oschersleben Germany despite adverse weather, a lack of fighter protection and heavy flak.  It participated in Big Week, the intensive attack against German aircraft industry in late February 1944.  It took part in Operation Crossbow, attacks on launch sites for V-1 flying bombs and V-2 rockets.  It struck airfields and industrial sites in France, Belgium, the Netherlands, and Germany.  After October 1944 it concentrated on transportation and oil industry targets.  On 11 September, it earned a second DUC for a mission against petroleum facilities at Merseburg. 

In addition to its strategic bombing mission, the squadron flew interdiction and air support missions.  During Operation Overlord, the Normandy invasion, it attacked coastal defenses, transportation junctions and marshalling yards near the beachhead. It provided air support for Operation Cobra, the Allied breakout at Saint Lo, It bombed bridges and gun positions to support Operation Market Garden, the airborne attacks in the Netherlands near Arnhem, to secure bridgeheads across the Rhine in September.  During the Battle of the Bulge, from December 1944 to January 1945, it attacked bridges and marshalling yards near the target area.  During Operation Varsity, the airborne assault across the Rhine, it provided cover by bombing airfields near the drop zone.  It flew its last combat mission on 25 April 1945, when the 92nd Group led the entire Eighth Air Force formation in an attack on Plzeň.

Following V-E Day, the squadron moved to Istres Air Base, France, where it participated in the Green Project, transporting troops returning to the United States, flying them to Cazes Field in Morocco until September, returning French servicemen to France on return trips.  During the winter it flew displaced Greek nationals from Munich to Athens.  It was inactivated in France on 28 February 1946 and its remaining personnel were absorbed into elements of the 306th Bombardment Group at Lechfeld Air Base, Germany.

Strategic Air Command

Reactivated as a Strategic Air Command (SAC) Boeing B-29 Superfortress squadron in July 1946.  Performed strategic bombardment training and operations directed by SAC.  In March 1948 deployed to England and Germany to support the Berlin Airlift.

Deployed to Far East Air Forces (FEAF) and flying combat missions over North Korea.  Under control of the Far East Air Forces Bomber Command (Provisional) until 20 October, the squadron bombed factories, refineries, iron works, hydroelectric plants, airfields, bridges, tunnels, troop concentrations, barracks, marshalling yards, road junctions, rail lines, supply dumps, docks, vehicles and other strategic and interdiction targets.

Released from combat on 20 October 1950.  Many of the still operational B-29s remained with FEAF to serve on with the 19th and 307th Bombardment Groups at Kadena Air Base, Okinawa; and the 98th Bombardment Group at Yokota Air Base, Japan.  Returned without most personnel and equipment to Spokane Air Force Base, Washington in late October and November 1950.

Re-equipped with the Convair B-36 Peacemaker intercontinental strategic bomber in 1951.  Engaged in training operations on a worldwide scale.  Deployed in August 1953 to the Far East was to survey suitable bases for B-36 use and to reinforce the Korean armistice of July 1953. 20 B-36D aircraft landed at Kadena AB, for 'Operation Big Stick'. B-36 aircraft visited Yokota Air Base and Anderson Air Force Base, Guam. The squadron returned to Fairchild after a short stay.  Redeployed to Guam 14 October 1954 for 90 days, which established a succession of deployed B-36 squadrons to maintain a heavy bomber presence in the western Pacific. Returned for its second 90-day deployment in April 1956.

During the 1956 deployment to Guam, four 327th B-36J aircraft were deployed to Hickam Air Force Base Hawaii. They would support Operation Redwing, the 1956 Eniwetok nuclear tests. B-36 operations were not without casualties. On 15 April 1952, a borrowed 327th B-36 with a 326th crew crashed on takeoff, killing 15 crewmen, 2 survived, severely burned. The "Magnesium Overcast" would burn very hot. In May 1955, the 327th was awarded the Air Force Outstanding Unit Award for Operation Big Stick.

In October 1956, the Squadron was scheduled to convert to the Boeing B-52D Stratofortress retaining its designation. Events in the fall of 1956 would delay the conversion to B-52. The Suez Crisis and Eastern Europe conflicts required the wing and squadrons to remain operational, and were on "cocked ground alert" into the second week of December. The 327th was not operational from 5 February 1957 to 1 June 1957. 327th B-52 operations continued through February 1963, with training missions to improve and maintain proficiency, served on Ground Alert, and participated in a seven-month test of Airborne Alert missions during 3 March, to 6 October 1959. The airborne alert test would earn the second AFOUA.

In July 1960, the 327th began the movement of the squadron’s personnel, aircraft and equipment to Larson Air Force Base, Washington. This was the completion of the dispersal program to reduce vulnerability of large (three squadron 45 B-52) unit at one base. The 326th Bombardment Squadron would move to Glasgow Air Force Base Montana in February 1961. On setup at Larson, the squadron resumed alert duties and training under the command of the 4170th Strategic Wing.

In an effort to honor heritage units of the past, on 1 February 1963, the 4170th and 327th when SAC inactivated its strategic wings, replacing them with permanent Air Force Wings. Squadron was inactivated with aircraft/personnel/equipment transferred to the 768th Bombardment Squadron, which was simultaneously activated.

Lineage
 Constituted as the 327th Bombardment Squadron (Heavy) on 28 January 1942
 Activated on 1 March 1942
 Redesignated 327th Bombardment Squadron, Heavy on 29 September 1944
 Inactivated on 28 February 1946
 Redesignated 327th Bombardment Squadron, Very Heavy on 15 July 1946
 Activated on 4 August 1946
 Redesignated 327th Bombardment Squadron, Medium on 28 May 1948
 Redesignated 327th Bombardment Squadron, Heavy' on 16 June 1951
 Discontinued and inactivated on 1 February 1963

Assignments
 92d Bombardment Group, 1 March 1942 – 28 February 1946
 92d Bombardment Group, 4 August 1946 (attached to 92d Bombardment Wing after 16 February 1951)
 92d Bombardment Wing, 16 June 1952
 4170th Strategic Wing, 1 June 1960 – 1 February 1963

Stations

 Barksdale Field, Louisiana, 1 March 1942
 MacDill Field, Florida, 26 March 1942
 Sarasota Army Air Field, Florida, 18 May – 18 July 1942
 RAF Bovingdon (AAF-112), England, 18 August 1942
 RAF Alconbury (AAF-102), England, 6 January 1943
 RAF Podington (AAF-109), England, 15 September 1943
 Istres Air Base (AAF 196), (Y-17), France, 9 September 1945 – 28 February 1946

 Fort Worth Army Airfield, Texas, 4 August 1946
 Smoky Hill Army Airfield, Kansas, 25 October 1946
 Spokane Army Air Field (later Spokane Air Force Base; Fairchild Air Force Base), Washington, 20 June 1947 (deployed to Yokota Air Base, Japan, 9 July – 27 October 1950)
 Larson Air Force Base, Washington, 1 June 1960 – 1 February 1963

Aircraft
 Boeing B-17 Flying Fortress, 1942–1946
 Boeing B-29 Superfortress, 1946, 1947–1951
 Convair B-36 Peacemaker, 1951–1957
 Boeing B-52 Stratofortress, 1957–1963

See also

 List of B-52 Units of the United States Air Force

References

Notes
 Explanatory notes

 Citations

Bibliography

External links

Military units and formations established in 1942
Bombardment squadrons of the United States Air Force
Bombardment squadrons of the United States Army Air Forces
United States Air Force units and formations in the Korean War